Gold chalcogenides are compounds formed between gold and one of the chalcogens, elements from group 16 of the periodic table: oxygen, sulfur, selenium, or tellurium.

Gold(III) oxide, Au2O3. Decomposes into gold and oxygen above 160 °C, and dissolves in concentrated alkalis to form solutions which probably contain the [Au(OH)4]− ion
Gold(I) sulfide, Au2S. Formed by reaction of hydrogen sulfide with gold(I) compounds.
Gold(III) sulfide, Au2S3, claimed material but unsubstantiated.
Gold tellurides: Au2Te3, Au3Te5, and AuTe2 (approximate formulæ) are known as non-stoichiometric compounds. They show metallic conductivity. Au3Te5 is a superconductor at 1.62 K.

Gold telluride minerals, such as calaverite and krennerite (AuTe2), petzite ( Ag3AuTe2), and sylvanite (AgAuTe4), are minor ores of gold (and tellurium). See telluride minerals for more information.

References

 

Gold compounds
Non-stoichiometric compounds
Sulfides
Tellurides

Transition metal oxides